The 1992 Nigerian Senate election in Kano State was held on July 4, 1992, to elect members of the Nigerian Senate to represent Kano State. Aminu Inuwa representing Kano Central and Magaji Abdullahi representing Kano North won on the platform of Social Democratic Party, while Isa Kachako representing Kano South won on the platform of the National Republican Convention.

Overview

Summary

Results

Kano Central 
The election was won by Aminu Inuwa of the Social Democratic Party.

Kano North 
The election was won by Magaji Abdullahi of the Social Democratic Party.

Kano South 
The election was won by Isa Kachako of the National Republican Convention.

References 

Kan
Kano State Senate elections
July 1992 events in Nigeria